Mariam Aladji Boni Diallo (born 1952) is a Beninese politician. She was Benin's Minister of Foreign Affairs from 10 April 2006 to 17 June 2007.

She was born in Nikki in 1952 and received an international education. Prior to becoming Foreign Minister, Diallo had been Secretary-General of the Ministry of Foreign Affairs since March 2004. She was a counsellor to the Benin Embassy in Germany. She served as a diplomatic advisor to President Boni Yayi.

Notes

References

1952 births
Living people
Foreign ministers of Benin
Women government ministers of Benin
People from Borgou Department
Female foreign ministers
21st-century Beninese women politicians
21st-century Beninese politicians
Beninese women diplomats